Camera Ntereke (born 5 May 1964) is a Botswana sprinter. He competed in the men's 400 metres at the 1992 Summer Olympics.

References

External links
 

1964 births
Living people
Athletes (track and field) at the 1992 Summer Olympics
Botswana male sprinters
Olympic athletes of Botswana
Place of birth missing (living people)